Taiwan Land Development Co., Ltd., (Chinese: 台灣土地開發公司) commonly referred to as TLDC or Taikai, is a real estate land development enterprise in Taiwan.

History 
Founded in 1964, TLDC assisted Chiang Kai-shek's government in the development of 30 industrial zones and a number of commercial and residential areas. In 1999, TLDC stock was listed, and in 2008, TLDC's government holdings were released and re-elected as directors and supervisors, and Chiu Fu-sheng was elected Chairman.  

In September 2021, Chiu Fu-sheng's daughter , former director and president of TLDC, took over as chairwoman. And, her father became the president of the company.

Controversies 

 In 2005, the company faced an insider trading investigation, when it shares were unethically traded by the local real estate developers after the critical business information was passed to them by then-chairman Su Teh-chien.

Development Projects  

  Kinmen Wind Lion Plaza
  Hualien LOHAS Creative Park
  Hsinchu Hsinpu Eco-community
  Huilanwan Sunrise Village

References 

1964 establishments in Taiwan
Land development companies
Companies based in Taipei
Companies established in 1964